Communauté d'agglomération du Sicoval is a communauté d'agglomération, an intercommunal structure, covering the southeastern suburbs of Toulouse. It is located in the Haute-Garonne department, in the Occitania region, southern France. Created in 2001, its seat is in Labège. Its area is 248.4 km2. Its population was 80,357 in 2019.

Composition
The communauté d'agglomération consists of the following 36 communes:

Aureville
Auzeville-Tolosane
Auzielle
Ayguesvives
Baziège
Belberaud
Belbèze-de-Lauragais
Castanet-Tolosan
Clermont-le-Fort
Corronsac
Deyme
Donneville
Escalquens
Espanès
Fourquevaux
Goyrans
Issus
Labastide-Beauvoir
Labège
Lacroix-Falgarde
Lauzerville
Mervilla
Montbrun-Lauragais
Montgiscard
Montlaur
Noueilles
Odars
Péchabou
Pechbusque
Pompertuzat
Pouze
Ramonville-Saint-Agne
Rebigue
Varennes
Vieille-Toulouse
Vigoulet-Auzil

References

Sicoval
Sicoval